Jonathan Cartwright may refer to:

Jonathan Cartwright, character in The Ambassador's Daughter (1956 film)
Jonathan Cartwright, political candidate in Wigan Council election, 2008
Jonathan Cartwright (Arrowverse), character in the Arrowverse franchise